Obol (also romanized as Obal or Obaĺ) is a Belarusian town of Shumilina Raion, in Vitebsk Region. In 2016, it had a population of 2,395.

History
Obol was known since the 16th century as a village of the Połock Voivodeship, in the Polish–Lithuanian Commonwealth. in 1772, following the Partitions of Poland, it became part of the Russian Empire.

In 1866, the construction of the Riga-Oryol railway contributed to its growth. The village was occupied from August 1941 to June 26, 1944 by the Nazi German troops, during World War II. In 1968 it was elevated from the status of village to the one of urban-type settlement.

Geography
Located in the middle of its Voblast, Obol lies between Vitebsk (64 km southeast) and Polatsk (36 km northwest), and is crossed by the homonym river. It is 21 km from Shumilino, 45 from Navapolatsk and 228 from Minsk. The town is served by the P20 highway and by the Smolensk-Vitebsk-Daugavpils-Riga railway.

Personalities
Zinaida Portnova (1926–1944), Russian partisan, Hero of the Soviet Union. In 1942 she joined the Belarusian resistance movement, becoming a member of the local underground Komsomol organization in Obol.

Twin towns
 Ödeshög (Ödeshög Municipality, Sweden)

References

External links
 

Urban-type settlements in Belarus
Populated places in Vitebsk Region
Polotsk Voivodeship
Polotsky Uyezd